The National University of Mongolia (Mongol Ulsyn Ikh Surguuli, abbreviated NUM or MUIS) is a public university primarily located in Ulaanbaatar, Mongolia. Established in 1942, it is the oldest institution of higher learning in Mongolia, and originally named in honour of Khorloogiin Choibalsan as Choibalsan State University. It hosts 5 main faculties in Ulaanbaatar, two branches (in Uliastai, Zavkhan Province and Erdenet, Orkhon Province), and three academies of national importance (Mongol studies, economics, and sustainable development).

After the establishment of the Mongolian People's Republic and its first modern secondary school in 1921, it was deemed necessary to establish an academic institution at a higher level. In 1942, the government established the National University of Mongolia as Mongolia's first university, with the first students graduating in 1946. During socialism, the university served as a training center for the party elite. Education was paid for and strictly controlled by the state. After democratization, it gradually changed into a more modern university. In 1995, it started to offer bachelors, masters, and doctoral programs.

It holds a distinguished place in Mongolia's modern history, serving as both its first university as well as a parent to many of the country's premier universities. Many of the country's higher education institutions can trace their ancestry back to the National University of Mongolia's faculties and sub-institutes, including the University of Science and Technology, University of Life Sciences, University of Medical Sciences, and the University of the Humanities.

As of 2018, there were over 18,000 students enrolled in various programs, mostly taught in Mongolian.

History

Founding
The origins of the National University of Mongolia date to the ruling party's 10th Congress, held from March to April 1940. According to the resolution passed on 5 April, there was a provision to "prepare for the establishment of an institution of higher learning", which would lay the groundwork for the NUM. As this resolution was one of the first that involved the participation of future leader Yumjaagiin Tsedenbal, a case has been made that the NUM's first proponent was the future leader.

The university was established on October 5, 1942, as the first modern university in Mongolia. The faculties were initially Pedagogy, Medicine, and Veterinary Sciences. Part of its operation were supported by staff and materials provided by the Soviet Union, so much of the instruction was conducted in Russian.

93 students were selected for a preparatory course according to their knowledge of Russian, with 57 graduating from the course to enrol in the university. This initial course was mostly taught by teachers from the Soviet secondary school in Ulaanbaatar. In addition to these graduates, some teachers with Russian language skills were selected, with the first enrolment consisting of a total of 93 students. Among Mongolians, those with sufficient Russian language skills were mostly of the Buryat ethnic group, many of which were the children of those purged in the 1930s. 70-90 percent of these first students were Buryats, while a sizeable minority were USSR citizens.

Socialist period
In 1943 the Faculty of Zootechnics was formed.

In 1946 the first graduation ceremony was held for 35 graduates.

In 1947 the Faculty of Social Sciences was formed, comprising departments of history and economics. In 1949, the faculties of Veterinary Sciences and Zootechnics merged to form the Faculty of Agriculture. Shortly thereafter in 1951, the Faculties of Chemistry and Biology were formed, while in the same year the Faculty of Pedagogy was spun off into a separate Pedagogical Institute (now the Mongolian State University of Education). Foreign language programs started in 1956, while programs for performing arts were started in 1957. 

In 1958, the Faculty of Agriculture was spun off into a separate Agricultural Institute (now the Mongolian State University of Agriculture).

Legal studies commenced in 1960, while programs in Geology in Mechanical Engineering were introduced in 1961. The same year, the Faculty of Medicine was made into a separate Medical Institute (now the Mongolian National University of Medical Sciences).

In 1962, programs in Meteorology, Construction, and Energy Engineering started.

The Nuclear Research Center was established in 1965, with cooperation of the Joint Institute for Nuclear Research in Dubna, USSR.

In 1969, the Polytechnical Institute was established under the NUM, comprising faculties of Civil Engineering, Power Engineering, Geology and Mining, Mechanical Engineering, and Engineering Economics. This institute was eventually formed into its own separate university in 1982, the Mongolian University of Science and Technology.

The Russian language institute was established in 1979, with this separating into an institute in 1982, eventually forming into the current University of the Humanities.

Modern era
The university played a crucial role in the Mongolian Revolution of 1990, playing host to various secret groups discussing democracy.

In 1994, 13 students were awarded master's degrees. In 1997, the department of postgraduate affairs was established with the purpose of increasing the number of postgraduate students.

The Mathematical Institute was merged into the NUM in 1997.

A governing board was established in 1999.

In 2004, the Khovd branch was spun off into an independent university, Khovd University.

Restructurings 
In 2010, Ulaanbaatar University and the Institute of Commerce and Business were merged into the NUM, while these both later became independent again, in 2015 (as the Ulaanbaatar State University) and 2017 (as the University of Commerce and Business), respectively.

Starting from 2014, a major restructuring took place, with the university now functioning with 5 main faculties, Business, International Relations and Public Administration, Law, Engineering and Applied Sciences, and Sciences.

Administration

Main faculties
 Business School
 School of International Relations and Public Administration
 School of Law
 School of Engineering and Applied Sciences
 School of Arts and Sciences

Branches
 NUM-Orkhon School (based in Erdenet, Orkhon Province)
 NUM-Zavkhan School (based in Uliastai, Zavkhan Province)

Affiliate institutions
 Baigali-Ekh high school and Ecological Education Center - high school (lyceum) in Ulaanbaatar.

Rectors

Academia
Admissions to NUM are based on Mongolian General Entrance Examination scores.

Ranking
National University of Mongolia is ranked 831th in the world and 120th in Asia in terms of the Article Influence Score between 1990-2020 in the Tilburg University Economics Ranking . </ref> Tilburg University Economics Ranking </ref>

Notable people

Alumni

Politics 
 Jambyn Batmönkh (economics) - last leader of the Mongolian People's Republic
 Radnaasümbereliin Gonchigdorj (mathematics) - Vice President of Mongolia and chairman of the State Great Khural
 Miyeegombyn Enkhbold (economics) - prime minister of Mongolia and chairman of the State Great Khural
 Norovyn Altankhuyag (physics & mathematics) - prime minister of Mongolia
 Zandaakhüügiin Enkhbold (law) - chairman of the State Great Khural
 Chimediin Saikhanbileg (law) - prime minister of Mongolia
 Ukhnaagiin Khürelsükh (law) - prime minister of Mongolia

Faculty 
 Bazaryn Shirendev (historian, rector)
 Galsan Tschinag (writer)
 Tumen Dashtseveg (archaeology)
 Tsetsegjargal Tseden (archaeology)
 Altangerel Perle (paleontology)
 Tserenbaltavyn Sarantuyaa (law)

Gallery

Notes

References

External links

 Official website (Mongolian)
 Official website (English)

 
Educational institutions established in 1942
Ulaanbaatar
1942 establishments in Mongolia